Promethea Olympia Kyrene Pythaitha (born "Jasmine Smith" on March 13, 1991) is an American child genius with an IQ of 173. She started reading at age 1, began learning college-level calculus and was profiled by a CBS News 48 Hours special on "Whiz Kids!" at age 7, and at age 13 became the youngest student to complete work for a bachelor's degree from Montana State University in Mathematics.

Early life and education 
Promethea was born to Georgia Smith, a Greek-born artist, and has two older siblings, Vanessa and Apollo. Her father, David Li, lives in San Jose, CA. For several months when Promethea was 4, she and her family were homeless and lived in their car in San Francisco. This was when her mother began to teach her advanced mathematics. At age 5, she was enrolled in Stanford University's Education Program for Gifted Youth. After being featured on a national CBS News special "Whiz Kids!", she was allowed to enroll as a regular student earning credit toward graduation at Montana State University. She audited her first M.S.U. course, calculus, at age 7. At age 13, she completed the course work necessary for a bachelor's degree in Mathematics, and at age 14 she officially graduated with that degree.

Paying for college had always been a difficulty for the young student. Due to her young age, she was automatically disqualified for most university scholarships, and couldn't hold a job. A local family had paid for her tuition through the completion of her first degree. After her graduation, she spoke of her desire to continue her education, but due to her family's low income could not afford to continue with her studies. She wrote to Montana politicians, arguing that the state of Montana pledges a taxpayer funded education to other teenagers (throughout what is generally their high school years), but that she was being abandoned. Her alma mater offered to waive her tuition until she turned 16.

In 2004, she changed her name, selecting names reflecting her aspirations and the ideals that she admired in ancient Greek history.

Controversy 
In 2006, Promethea was awarded a $10,000 scholarship by the PanHellenic Scholarship Foundation. In January 2007, she was invited to speak in Chicago at a banquet to honor the Festival of the Three Hierarchs, a commemoration of the three founders of the Greek Orthodox Church. Her topic was to be the role of the church in education. During her research on the church founders, Promethea became convinced that the Church had committed genocide. In her speech, she demanded a separation of church and state, as well as the end of church control on education. The event was posted to YouTube and seen by Greeks around the world. Promethea received messages from passionate Greeks in America and Greece. Some sent her hate mail, but others commended her courage and sent books and offers of tuition. After her speech, she was invited to visit Greece for five days and was interviewed by Alpha TV.

In 2011, she witnessed a shooting involving her mother and a man who was stalking Promethea. The stalker was subsequently shot and killed by sheriff's deputies after pointing a handgun at them. In 2013, a settlement was reached in the subsequent court case.

References

Further reading
 .

1991 births
Living people
Montana State University alumni